41st Tactical Squadron (known as 41.ELT - 41 Eskadra Lotnictwa Taktycznego in Poland) is a fighter squadron of Polish Air Force established in 2001 in Malbork, Poland. Squadron is stationed in 22nd Air Base. The squadron operates Mikoyan MiG-29 jet fighters acquired from the German Luftwaffe. Previously these aircraft served with Jagdgeschwader 73 stationed at Rostock-Laage Airport. From 1952 to 2001 unit was known as "41. Pułk Lotnictwa Myśliwskiego"

Fighters
Retired:
MiG-15 Jet Fighters (1954 - 1958)
MiG-17 Jet Fighters (1958 - 1981)
MiG-19 Jet Fighters (1959 - 1963)
MiG-21 Jet Fighters (1963 - 2003)
Current:
MiG-29B
MiG-29UB

References

Squadrons of the Polish Air Force